Giulio Mancinelli (1537-1618) was 16th and 17th century Jesuit missionary. In 1583 he founded Jesuit mission in Ottoman held Istanbul.

Early life 

Mancinelli was born to a noble family. He joined the Jesuits in 1558 and in 1566 was a novice in the first novitiate house in Rome.

Missionary appointments 
Mancinelli was a missionary in Bosnia and Dalmatia.
Mancinellus was the head of a Jesuit mission to Istanbul established by the Pope in 1583. They held their services in the Church of Saint Benoit and opened their schools with the support of French and Venetian ambassadors.

In the period between 1585 and 1587 Mancinelli traveled from Constantinople through Wallachia and Moldova, visited Lvov (then in the Crown of the Kingdom of Poland and the Grand Duchy of Lithuania, now in Ukraine, and later Kraków, Crown of the Kingdom of Poland and the Grand Duchy of Lithuania. Having journeyed as far as Russia, he then returned to Italy via Vienna, where he spent a few months.

In 1592 he was sent to Algiers, in response to a request made to the Jesuits by the government of Naples, in order to redeem the Christian slaves:  he wrote a memorial of this journey in Morea (Rome, Archivum Romanum Societatis Iesu, Vitae, 46 , cf. 68-83) and in" Observations about redeeming Christian slaves from Servitude to Unbelievers" (ibid., Vitae, 51, cc. 43r-45r). He experienced a supernatural ecstasy during the trip---saints and angels appeared to him to reassure him about the positive outcome of the mission to Moldova---and he recorded his observations.

In 1608, he was on mission in England and according to his own testimonies had visions of angels. In his old age he was regularly consulted by young men who traveled to England hoping to bring it back to union with Rome.

References

Sources

External links
 MANCINELLI, Giulio, author Anna Rita Capoccia

Further reading 
 Julije Mancinelli o dubrovačkoj okolici (1575/76) /Julius Mancinelli about the Surroundings 'of Dubrovnik (1575/76), XVI (1986) 133-151. BUDIŠA, Dražen

1537 births
1618 deaths
Angelic visionaries
16th-century Italian Jesuits
People from Macerata
Jesuit missionaries
Italian Roman Catholic missionaries
Roman Catholic missionaries in Turkey
Roman Catholic missionaries in the Ottoman Empire
Roman Catholic missionaries in Moldova